The Fallschirmjägerkompanien B1 (English: Paratroopercompanies B1) were specially trained units of the German Bundeswehr and the predecessor of the current German army's special operations unit Kommando Spezialkräfte.

History
In 1989 the Bundeswehr began planning the establishment of specialised units which could be tasked with conducting isolated operations against high-value targets.

In 1992 each of the three Bundeswehr corps was assigned with one of the Commando Companies. These were located at:

 252nd Paratrooper battalion in Nagold.
 261st Paratrooper battalion in Lebach.
 271st Paratrooper battalion in Iserlohn.

In 1996, all existing Commando Companies were merged into the newly established Kommando Spezialkräfte (KSK) along with the Deep Reconnaissance Companies 100 and 300 among others.

Mission and training
The commando companies were tasked with:
 Direct action against high-value military targets
 Sabotage operations
 Reconnaissance patrols

Members of the Commando Companies received training by other NATO special forces units and the GSG9 of the then-Bundesgrenzschutz.

Equipment
The equipment of the Commando Companies consisted mainly of the standard equipment of the Bundeswehr of that time.
Firearms included:
 Pistol P1
 Uzi submachine gun
 Heckler & Koch G3
 MG 3 machine gun

The Commando Companies also trained and experimented with Warsaw Pact weaponry which was available in the Bundeswehr due to the recent unification with East Germany's National People's Army.

References

Further reading

Special forces of Germany
Special forces of West Germany
Units and formations of the German Army (1956–present)